Boletacarus is a genus of mites in the family Acaridae.

Species
 Boletacarus globosus (Berlese, 1921)
 Boletacarus sibiricus V. I. Volgin & S. V. Mironov, 1980

References

Acaridae